The meridian 179° west of Greenwich is a line of longitude that extends from the North Pole across the Arctic Ocean, Asia, the Pacific Ocean, the Southern Ocean, and Antarctica to the South Pole.

The 179th meridian west forms a great circle with the 1st meridian east.

From Pole to Pole
Starting at the North Pole and heading south to the South Pole, the 179th meridian west passes through:

{| class="wikitable plainrowheaders"
! scope="col" width="130" | Co-ordinates
! scope="col" width="110" | Country, territory or sea
! scope="col" | Notes
|-
| style="background:#b0e0e6;" | 
! scope="row" style="background:#b0e0e6;" | Arctic Ocean
| style="background:#b0e0e6;" |
|-
| 
! scope="row" | 
| Chukotka Autonomous Okrug — Wrangel Island
|-
| style="background:#b0e0e6;" | 
! scope="row" style="background:#b0e0e6;" | Chukchi Sea
| style="background:#b0e0e6;" |
|-
| 
! scope="row" | 
| Chukotka Autonomous Okrug
|-valign="top"
| style="background:#b0e0e6;" | 
! scope="row" style="background:#b0e0e6;" | Bering Sea
| style="background:#b0e0e6;" | Passing just west of Gareloi Island, Alaska,  (at ) Passing just east of Unalga Island, Alaska,  (at ) Passing just west of Kavalga Island, Alaska,  (at ) Passing just west of Ulak Island, Alaska,  (at ) Passing just east of Amatignak Island, Alaska,  (at )
|-valign="top"
| style="background:#b0e0e6;" | 
! scope="row" style="background:#b0e0e6;" | Pacific Ocean
| style="background:#b0e0e6;" | Passing just east of the island of Qelelevu,  (at )
|-
| 
! scope="row" | 
| Island of Vanua Balavu
|-valign="top"
| style="background:#b0e0e6;" | 
! scope="row" style="background:#b0e0e6;" | Pacific Ocean
| style="background:#b0e0e6;" | Passing just east of the island of Mago,  (at ) Passing just west of the island of Tuvuca,  (at ) Passing just east of the island of Nayau,  (at ) Passing just west of the island of Lakeba,  (at ) Passing just west of the island of Vuaqava,  (at ) Passing just west of the island of Kabara,  (at ) Passing just west of the island of Ono-i-Lau,  (at )
|-
| style="background:#b0e0e6;" | 
! scope="row" style="background:#b0e0e6;" | Southern Ocean
| style="background:#b0e0e6;" |
|-
| 
! scope="row" | Antarctica
| Ross Dependency, claimed by 
|-
|}

See also
178th meridian west
180th meridian

w179 meridian west